One Evening may refer to:

 "One Evening" (short story), a story by Samuel Beckett included in The Complete Short Prose 1929-1989
 "One Evening", a song by The Jesus Lizard from Head
 "One Evening (Feist song)", a song by Feist from Let It Die